San Francisco, California, in the United States, has at least 482 high-rises, 58 of which are at least  tall. The city's second-tallest building is the Transamerica Pyramid, which rises , and was previously the city's tallest for 45 years, from 1972 to 2017. The city's third-tallest building is 181 Fremont, rising to 802 ft (244 m).

San Francisco has 27 skyscrapers that rise at least 492 feet (150 m). Six more skyscrapers of over 150 m are under construction, have been approved for construction, or have been proposed. Its skyline is currently ranked second in the Western United States (after Los Angeles) and sixth in the United States, after New York City, Chicago, Miami, Houston, and Los Angeles.



History

San Francisco's first skyscraper was the  Chronicle Building, which was completed in 1890.  M. H. de Young, owner of the San Francisco Chronicle, commissioned Burnham and Root to design a signature tower to convey the power of his newspaper.  Not to be outdone, de Young's rival, industrialist Claus Spreckels, purchased the San Francisco Call in 1895 and commissioned a tower of his own that would dwarf the Chronicle Building.  The  Call Building was completed in 1898 and stood across Market Street from the Chronicle Building.  The Call Building (later named the Spreckels Building, and Central Tower today) would remain the city's tallest for nearly a quarter century.

Both steel-framed structures survived the 1906 earthquake, demonstrating that tall buildings could be safely constructed in earthquake country.  Other early twentieth-century skyscrapers above  include the Merchants Exchange Building (1903), Humboldt Bank Building (1908), Hobart Building (1914), and Southern Pacific Building (1916).  Another skyscraper boom took hold during the 1920s, when several Neo-Gothic and Art Deco high rises, reaching three to four hundred feet (90 to 120 m) in height, were constructed, including the Standard Oil Building (1922), Pacific Telephone Building (1925), Russ Building (1927), Hunter-Dulin Building (1927), 450 Sutter Medical Building (1929), Shell Building (1929), and McAllister Tower (1930).

The Great Depression and World War II halted any further skyscraper construction until the 1950s when the Equitable Life Building (1955) and Crown-Zellerbach Building (1959) were completed. Many of San Francisco's tallest buildings, particularly its office skyscrapers, were completed in a building boom from the late 1960s until the late 1980s. During the 1960s, at least 40 new skyscrapers were built, and the Hartford Building (1965), 44 Montgomery (1967), Bank of America Center (1969), and Transamerica Pyramid (1972) each, in turn, took the title of tallest building in California upon completion.

This surge of construction was dubbed "Manhattanization" by opponents and led to local legislation that set some of the strictest building height limits and regulations in the country. In 1985, San Francisco adopted the Downtown Plan, which slowed development in the Financial District north of Market Street and directed it to the area South of Market around the Transbay Terminal. Over 250 historic buildings were protected from development and developers were required to set aside open space for new projects. In response, voters approved Proposition M in November 1986 that reduced the annual limit to  until the grandfathered square footage was accounted for, which occurred in 1999.

These limits, combined with the early 1990s recession, led to a significant slowdown of skyscraper construction during the late 1980s and 1990s. To guide new development, the city passed several neighborhood plans, such as the Rincon Hill Plan in 2005 and Transit Center District Plan in 2012, which allow taller skyscrapers in certain specific locations in the South of Market area. Since the early 2000s, the city has been undergoing another building boom, with numerous buildings over 400 feet (122 m) proposed, approved, or under construction; some, such as the two-towered One Rincon Hill and mixed-use 181 Fremont, have been completed. This building is the first supertall skyscraper in San Francisco and among the tallest in the United States.

Tallest buildings
This includes spires and architectural details but does not include antenna masts. The "Year" column indicates the year in which a building was completed.

Tallest under construction, approved and proposed

Under construction
This lists buildings that are under construction in San Francisco and are planned to rise at least . Under construction buildings that have already been topped out are also included.

Approved
This lists buildings that are approved for construction in San Francisco and are planned to rise at least .

Proposed
This lists buildings that are proposed in San Francisco and are planned to rise at least .

* Table entries with dashes (—) indicate that information regarding building floor counts or dates of completion has not yet been released.

Timeline of tallest buildings
This lists buildings that once held the title of tallest building in San Francisco as well as the current titleholder, the Salesforce Tower.

Notes

 Please note, that San Francisco with 29 high rises according to your numbers is ahead of Dallas.  29 vs 22 Please correct.  Added with 10 planned high rises of 500 feet or more, it will in time surpass LA.  Including one of well over 1,000 ft.

References
General

Specific

External links

Diagram of San Francisco skyscrapers on SkyscraperPage
The skyscrapers of San Francisco Video detailing the San Francisco skyline.

 
San Francisco
San Francisco

Tallest buildings